Aminuddin Kagzi is an Indian politician. He is a Member of the Rajasthan Legislative Assembly from the Kishanpole Assembly constituency since 2018. He is associated with the Indian National Congress.

References 

Indian National Congress (Organisation) politicians
Rajasthan MLAs 2018–2023
Year of birth missing (living people)
Living people